Comitini (Sicilian: Cuminiti) is a comune (municipality) in the Province of Agrigento in the Italian region Sicily, located about  southeast of Palermo and about  northeast of Agrigento.

History
The town was founded in 1627 by Gastone Bellacera on a hill named Comitini. In 1673, Michele Gravina was appointed prince of the town.

In the early 19th century the extraction of sulfur from the mines in the territory, due to an increased demand caused by the Industrial Revolution in Great Britain, gave a new impulse to the economy which was followed by a remarkable population growth. The town became one of the most  important mining centres of the Agrigento province, as described by Luigi Pirandello in his novel The Old and the Young (I vecchi e i giovani) (1928). With the decline of the sulfur mining industry in the 20th century many townspeople opted for emigration.

A long strip of land between the country towns of Aragona and Grotte, Comitini boasts a substantial agricultural production of almonds, olives, grapes, and citrus fruits.

Comitini borders the following municipalities Aragona, Favara, Grotte.

References

External links
 Official website

Cities and towns in Sicily